Yun Jeong-hye (born 18 May 1966) is a South Korean volleyball player. She competed at the 1984 Summer Olympics and the 1988 Summer Olympics.

References

1966 births
Living people
South Korean women's volleyball players
Olympic volleyball players of South Korea
Volleyball players at the 1984 Summer Olympics
Volleyball players at the 1988 Summer Olympics
Place of birth missing (living people)